Timothy Arthur Dent Bevington (22 August 1881 – 4 May 1966) was an English and Canadian cricketer. He was a left-handed batsman. He played 14 first-class matches between 1900 and 1913, mainly for Middlesex and the Marylebone Cricket Club (MCC). He later settled in Canada and played his last first-class match for a combined Canada/USA team against Australia. He died in Vancouver in 1966, aged 84.

He was born in Amwell House, Hertfordshire.

He was educated at Harrow School.

References

Cricket Archive profile
Cricinfo profile

1881 births
1966 deaths
English cricketers
Middlesex cricketers
Marylebone Cricket Club cricketers
People from Great Amwell
P. F. Warner's XI cricketers
A. J. Webbe's XI cricketers
People educated at Harrow School
British emigrants to Canada